Don J. Sunderlage (December 20, 1929 – July 15, 1961) was an American basketball player.

A 6'1" guard from Roselle, Illinois, Sunderlage played collegiately at the University of Illinois, earning the Chicago Tribune Silver Basketball award in 1951.  From 1953 to 1955, he played in the National Basketball Association as a member of the Milwaukee Hawks and Minneapolis Lakers.  He averaged 7.7 points per game in his career and represented the Hawks at the 1954 NBA All-Star Game.

High school
A native of Roselle, Illinois, Sunderlage attended Elgin High School from 1943–44 to 1946–47. He was a  guard who led his team to a Big 8 Conference championship while setting the Elgin High School scoring record of 359 points during the 1946-47 season. Following his senior season, Sunderlage was selected to play in a North-South All Star game where he was the high scorer for the North. In two varsity seasons, Sunderlage's Elgin Maroons teams won 35 games while only losing 6 (win pct=85.3%).

In 1973, Sunderlage was inducted into the Illinois Basketball Coaches Association's Hall of Fame as a player.

College
In the fall of 1947, Sunderlage enrolled at the University of Illinois and was a member of the freshman basketball team. In his sophomore year he was the starting point guard of the 1948-49 Fighting Illini team that finished first in the Big Nine with a 21-4 record and advanced to the NCAA Tournament. Illinois defeated Yale to earn a berth in the Final Four (only eight teams played in the tournament back then), but lost to eventual national champion Kentucky, 76–47. They defeated Oregon State in the third place game, however. This was Illinois’ first 20-game winning team since 1908 which equaled a final AP ranking of No. 4 in the nation.

The 1949–50 season was the worst of Sunderlage's three varsity seasons of Illini basketball. The absence of Dike Eddleman's 329 points from the previous season left the Illini with a fourth-place finish in the conference at 7 wins and 5 losses while finishing the regular season with an overall record of 14 wins and 8 losses. After the season, Sunderlage was named captain for the following season on a team that added future All-Americans Jim Bredar and Irv Bemoras. Even with the lack of overall success by the team, Sunderlage won the Ralph Woods Memorial Free Throw trophy in 1950

Unlike the previous season, the 1950–51 campaign was the best of Sunderlage's time at Illinois. A 13 win conference season marked only the second time since 1942 that the Fighting Illini men's basketball team had completed that feat. Head coach Harry Combes had guided his team to a Big Ten championship, a third-place finish in the 1951 NCAA Men's Division I Basketball Tournament and a final AP ranking of No. 5 in the nation. The 1950-51 team compiled an overall record of 22 wins and 5 losses with a conference record of 13 wins and 1 loss. During the tournament, Illinois beat Columbia, 79-71, and North Carolina State, 84-70, to get to the national semifinals and a rematch with the Kentucky Wildcats, which had downed the Illini in the national semifinals in 1949. In a heart-breaking loss, Kentucky nipped Illinois, 76-74. The Illini collected third place nationally by beating Oklahoma A&M, 61-46, in Minneapolis. Along with Sunderlage, the team included and Ted Beach, Rodney Fletcher, Irving Bemoras, Robert Peterson and Mack Follmer.

After the completion of his senior season, Sunderlage was named the Most Valuable Player of the Big Ten Conference and honored with the Chicago Tribune Silver Basketball award. He was also a Helms 2nd team All-American, a Sporting News 2nd team All-American, a United Press International 3rd team All-American, a Converse 3rd team All-American and an Associated Press Honorable Mention All-American. In addition to his other honors, Sunderlage was the first Illinois player to score more than 400 points in a season (471 in 1951). In his three years of varsity basketball, Sunderlage played in 74 games while scoring 777 points for an average of 10.5 points per game. His teams won 57 games while losing only 17 (win pct=77.0%).

In 2008, Sunderlage was honored as one of the thirty-three honored jerseys which hang in the State Farm Center to show regard for being the most decorated basketball players in the University of Illinois' history.

Professional basketball
After leaving the University of Illinois, Sunderlage played professionally for two seasons in the National Basketball Association. He was selected in the 1951 NBA Draft by the Philadelphia Warriors in the first round. He never ended up playing for them, however, as he was traded for Mark Workman to the Milwaukee Hawks on November 19, 1952, just as the 1953–54 NBA season began. An additional misfortune for Sunderlage was the fact that he was required to serve a year in the military, pushing his start in the NBA back a season. He played in 68 games and averaged over 11 points per game for the Hawks and was a coaches selection for the 1954 NBA All-Star Game. In September 1954, Sunderlage was again traded, this time to the Minneapolis Lakers. He played in 45 games for the Lakers during the 1954–55 NBA season but his minutes and scoring were drastically reduced from his previous season and on July 1, 1955 he was released from his contract.

Personal life & death
Sunderlage was the son of Alfred Henry Sunderlage and Hulda Louise Minnie Sunderlage and married Mary "Janice" Newby. Their marriage resulted in the birth of one son, Steven, born December 23, 1959.

On July 15, 1961, Sunderlage and his wife died following a car accident in Lake Geneva, Wisconsin.

Honors
 1951 - First-team All-Big Ten
 1951 - Team MVP and Captain
 1951 - All-American
 1951 - Earned the Chicago Tribune''s Silver Basketball award
 1951 - Big Ten Player of the Year
 1951 - University of Illinois Athlete of the Year
 1973 - Inducted into the Illinois Basketball Coaches Association's Hall of Fame as a player.
 2008 - Honored as one of the thirty-three honored jerseys which hang in the State Farm Center to show regard for being the most decorated basketball players in the University of Illinois' history.

Statistics

College basketball

NBA career statistics

Regular season

External links

References

1929 births
1961 deaths
All-American college men's basketball players
Basketball players from Illinois
Illinois Fighting Illini men's basketball players
Milwaukee Hawks players
Minneapolis Lakers players
National Basketball Association All-Stars
People from Roselle, Illinois
Philadelphia Warriors draft picks
Road incident deaths in Wisconsin
American men's basketball players
Point guards